Noor Matti (Arabic: نور متي) is an Iraqi-American radio and television host. He is most prominently known for creating Babylon FM in Erbil, the first all-English radio station in Iraq. After the radio station's establishment in 2012, Noor began to host morning shows that reached Duhok, Sulaymaniyah and Mosul, totaling an audience as much as 15,000 daily. In 2015, he received death threats from the Islamic State, after continuously mocking the terror group from nearby Erbil. In 2018, Noor began to host the weekly Arabic TV show "'Bene w Benak'" on Babylon TV, where he interviews young professionals from Iraq and the region.

Early life
Noor was born to an Assyrian family belong to the Chaldean Catholic Church in Baghdad, but was raised in Erbil's Ankawa area. In 1992, his family left the country after the worsening situation due to the United Nation's Sanctions against Iraq. His family and other Iraqi refugees arrived in the shores of Greece after taking a boat from Turkey. In 1994, his family finally settled in Warren, Michigan, where he stayed until 2008.

Move to Iraq
After graduating from Wayne State University, Noor decided to move back to Iraq in 2008. In 2010, he began to present the news in English for Ishtar TV. In 2012, he joined Babylon Media and began to craft Babylon FM as the only all-English radio station in Iraq. In October 2012, he went on air with "Noor In The Morning." In October 2018, he returned to TV as presenting a weekly comedy-interview show "Bene W Benak" on Babylon TV. Noor was featured in Larry Charles' Dangerous World of Comedy.

Presenting career
Besides regularly presenting shows on Babylon FM and Babylon TV, Noor has hosted various events and occasions in Erbil including the 2016 Miss Kurdistan beauty pageant.

Shlama Foundation
After the Islamic Invasion of Nineveh Governorate in August 2014, Noor co-founded the Shlama Foundation, an NGO helping the Assyrian communities throughout Iraq. He is currently the president of the foundation. His work through the foundation led to him be invited to present for the 2017 Raoul Follereau congress.

References

Year of birth missing (living people)
Living people
Iraqi radio people